Modesto Gavazzi, O.F.M. Conv. (died 1657) was a Roman Catholic prelate who served as Archbishop of Chieti (1657).

Biography
Modesto Gavazzi was ordained a priest in the Order of Friars Minor Conventual.
On 19 Feb 1657, he was appointed during the papacy of Pope Alexander VII as Archbishop of Chieti. He died soon after on 6 Mar 1657. Modesto Gavazzi was scholastic philosopher and a close friend and colleague of the better-known Scotists Bonaventura Belluto (1600–76) and Bartholomew Mastrius.

References

External links and additional sources
 (for Chronology of Bishops) 
 (for Chronology of Bishops) 

17th-century Italian Roman Catholic archbishops
Bishops appointed by Pope Alexander VII
1657 deaths
Conventual Franciscan bishops